This is a list of transfers in Bosnian football for the 2013–14 winter transfer window.
Only moves featuring a Premier League of Bosnia and Herzegovina, First League of the Republika Srpska and First League of the Federation of Bosnia and Herzegovina side are listed.

Premier League of Bosnia and Herzegovina

Željezničar

In:

Out:

Sarajevo

In:

Out:

Široki Brijeg

In:

Out:

Zrinjski Mostar

In:

Out:

Borac Banja Luka

In:

Out:

Olimpic

In:

Out:

Velež

In:

Out:

Čelik

In:

Out:

Zvijezda Gradačac

In:

Out:

Radnik Bijeljina

In:

Out:

Vitez

In:

Out:

Slavija

In:

Out:

Mladost Velika Obarska

In:

Out:

Rudar Prijedor

In:

Out:

Travnik

In:

Out:

Leotar

In:

Out:

See also
Premier League of Bosnia and Herzegovina
First League of the Republika Srpska
First League of the Federation of Bosnia and Herzegovina
2013–14 Premier League of Bosnia and Herzegovina
2013–14 First League of the Republika Srpska
2013–14 First League of the Federation of Bosnia and Herzegovina

References

Transfers
Bosnia
2013–14